Antelope Acres is an unincorporated community in Los Angeles County, California. It lies at an elevation of 2425 feet (739 m).

The community has a population of about 2,800. It is a rural community centered south of California State Highway 138 (Avenue D) near 90th Street West.

The community has become the home to many commuters who work in nearby cities; however, it still maintains a significant agricultural presence with livestock, field crops, and a local chapter of the 4H club. It also offers an open landscape for outdoor enthusiasts.

Services
Being a rural community, municipal services are minimal with many emergency services coming from nearby Lancaster. The community supports a small grocery store (with an 8 pump gas station), a church, a feed/hardware store, a local internet provider, a volunteer fire station, and a Mexican style food restaurant.

Geography
The topography is essentially flat desert scrubland. The Antelope Valley California Poppy Reserve lies to the west of Antelope Acres.

References

Unincorporated communities in Los Angeles County, California
Antelope Valley
Populated places in the Mojave Desert
Unincorporated communities in California